Cryptops haasei is a species of centipede in the Cryptopidae family. It is native to Australia and was first described in 1903 by Austrian myriapodologist Carl Attems.

Distribution
The species has been recorded from Queensland, New South Wales and Western Australia.

References

 

 
haasei
Centipedes of Australia
Fauna of New South Wales
Fauna of Queensland
Fauna of Western Australia
Animals described in 1903
Taxa named by Carl Attems